Ergün Berisha (born 26 April 1988) is a retired footballer. Born in Switzerland, he represented Turkey at youth international levels.

Career
Born in Zürich with Swiss nationality, Berisha started his career at Grasshopper Club Zürich and on 25 June 2009 joined Udinese. After failing to make an appearance for Udinese, he left for Turkish Süper Lig side İstanbul Büyükşehir Belediyespor on loan until the end of season on 1 February 2010.

Berisha made his club debut at Turkish Cup. His loan was extended in July 2010 but officially registered at Turkish Football Federation on 19 January 2011. He played 1 game in 2010–11 season, and also played 2 games in the reserve league.

On 4 February 2013, he signed for Swiss Challenge League team FC Wil.

International career
He is former member of the Turkey national under-17 football team at 2005 FIFA U-17 World Championship and current member of the Turkey national under-21 football team. Her played his first U21 match on 18 November 2009, a 0–0 draw with Estonia U21.

References

External links
Ergün Berisha – Fussballdaten – Die Fußball-Datenbank

Ergün Berisha Profile at Kicker.de 

Living people
1988 births
Footballers from Zürich
Turkish footballers
Turkey under-21 international footballers
Turkey youth international footballers
Swiss men's footballers
Turkish people of Albanian descent
Swiss people of Turkish descent
Swiss people of Albanian descent
Grasshopper Club Zürich players
Udinese Calcio players
İstanbul Başakşehir F.K. players
FC Wil players
Swiss Super League players
Süper Lig players
Serie A players
Turkish expatriate footballers
Swiss expatriate footballers
Expatriate footballers in Italy
Turkish expatriate sportspeople in Italy
Swiss expatriate sportspeople in Italy
Association football midfielders